Mauritia flexuosa, known as the moriche palm, ité palm, ita, buriti, muriti, miriti (Brazil), canangucho (Colombia), acho (Ecuador), or aguaje (Peru), is a palm tree. It grows in and near swamps and other wet areas in tropical South America.

The large leaves form a rounded crown. The flowers are yellowish and appear from December to April. The fruit, which grows from December to June, is a chestnut color and is covered with shiny scales. The yellow flesh covers a hard, oval nut. The seeds float, and this is the means by which the palm tree propagates. In natural populations, the tree reaches very high densities.

Fruit

Moriche palm fruit ("morete" in the Oriente of Ecuador) is edible and used to make juice, jam, ice cream, a fermented "wine", desserts and snacks, requiring harvesting of more than 50 tonnes per day in Peru.

The inflorescence buds are eaten as a vegetable and the sap can be drunk fresh or fermented (see palm wine). Threads and cords are locally produced from the tree's fibers.

Humans consume palm weevil larvae (Rhynchophorus palmarum) which burrow in the tree trunk.

Oil
Buriti oil is an orange-reddish oil extracted from the fruit of the moriche palm. The oil contains high concentrations of oleic acid, tocopherols, and carotenoids, especially beta-carotene. The oil has a reddish color used as ink on hides and skins.

Ecology
This tree is important to many animal species; several bird species, such as the red-bellied macaw, sulphury flycatcher, and moriche oriole, use it for nesting and food. Tapirs, peccaries, fish and monkeys depend on the fruit.

Alexander von Humboldt documented the tree and the ecosystem it supports in 1800 when traveling through the Llanos region of Venezuela. He "observed with astonishment how many things are connected with the existence of a single plant." He called it the "tree of life" and essentially described it as a keystone species although the concept would not be explicitly defined until 1969 by Robert T. Paine.

Miscellaneous
The government of the Federal District – the Brazilian state where the country's capital, Brasília, is located – is called Palácio do Buriti ("Buriti Palace"). Across the street from the building is a square with fountains and a single moriche palm tree, which was taken from the outskirts of the city and replanted there. The species is a common feature of the cerrado vegetation that predominates in central Brazil.

References

External links

flexuosa
Flora of South America
Trees of Brazil
Trees of Trinidad and Tobago
Flora of the Amazon
Flora of the Cerrado
Flora of Venezuela
Edible plants
Plants described in 1782
Crops originating from South America
Trees of Bolivia
Trees of Peru
Trees of Ecuador
Trees of Colombia
Trees of Suriname
Trees of French Guiana
Trees of Guyana
Trees of Venezuela